The Boutokaan Kiribati Moa Party (BKM) is a political party in Kiribati from the merger of the Kiribati First Party and Boutokaan te Koaua in 2020.

History 
The party was established in May 2020, after the merger of the Pillars of Truth with the  Kiribati First Party of Banuera Berina and twelve other MPs which left the Tobwaan Kiribati Party following the government's decision to cut diplomatic ties with Taiwan in favor of closer relations with China.
On 22 May 2020, at the first meeting of the Maneaba ni Maungatabu, BKM nominated Banuera Berina as candidate for Beretitenti election.

References

External links 
 

Political parties in Kiribati
Political parties established in 2020
2020 establishments in Kiribati